Ohotu railway station was a station on the North Island Main Trunk in New Zealand. When the station closed to all traffic, on 10 August 1959, it had a shelter shed and passenger platform. It was part of the  Mangaweka to Taihape section, opened by the Prime Minister, Richard Seddon, on 21 November 1904. The station was across the Hautapu River from Torere village, which had been surveyed in 1896.

Only a single track remains through the station site and there is little sign that there was ever a station there.

The New Zealand Ministry for Culture and Heritage gives a translation of "place of [the] fifteenth night of the moon" for Ōhotu.

Name 
From 1908 Egmont Box Co had a sawmill at Ohutu, sometimes called Utiku, or Torere. When the track laying reached Ohotu in April 1904, it was described as Torere Junction. From 5 January 1915 Egmont Box Co's siding, was renamed Ohotu and it then became a booking station handling passengers and parcels. The name of the post office changed from Ohutu to Ohotu in 1925.

Timber 
Its tramway was extended as the bush was cut, until it was cut out in 1921 and the mill closed. When the bush was cut out the bridge was sold for scrap. During demolition in 1923 it collapsed, killing one man and injuring another.

References

External links 

 Photo of Egmont Box tramway bridge in 1920s

Defunct railway stations in New Zealand